Sebastiania cruenta is a species of flowering plant in the family Euphorbiaceae. It was originally described as Stillingia cruenta Standl. & Steyerm. in 1944. It is native to Mexico and Guatemala.

References

Plants described in 1944
Flora of Guatemala
Flora of Mexico
cruenta